Charles Henry Bourne Quennell (1872–1935), was an English architect, designer, illustrator and historian.  According to the heritage architect Cath Layton, "his great influence [as an architect and urban planner] can be felt in the houses and streets of London’s suburbs and across the country." His obituary in Nature noted that his books for children and young people had "strongly stimulated interest in the cultural background of the more formal study of history".<ref>C.H.B. Quennell, Nature', 11 January 1936. Retrieved 10 November 2022.</ref>

Life and career
Quennell was the son of Henry Quennell, a builder, and his wife Emma Rebecca (née Hobbs), and grew up in a house at Cowley Road on the Holland Town Estate, Kennington, London.

He was articled to Newman and Newman, and worked in the offices of J. McK. Brydon and of J. D. Sedding and Henry Wilson. He obtained the National Gold medal for Architecture, and RIBA Medal of Merit and £5 in the Soane Medallion competition in 1895. He began practice in 1896 working with his brother William developing houses at Hampstead Garden Suburb and then with developer George Washington Hart.

He designed a house for Francis Crittall window manufacturer at Braintree, Essex in 1908.

He designed a house for Walter Crittall son of window manufacturer Francis Crittall at Braintree, Essex in 1912.

He co-designed a 'show house' with Walter Crittall at 156-158 Cressing Road, Braintree, Essex. the house incorporated many modernist features such as a drying yard for clothes, a scullery, a larder, fuel store, outside lavatory, living room, parlour, three bedrooms and an inside bathroom and hot press.

Discussing the leading English furniture designs of the time, Herman Muthesius wrote in his book The English House (1904):
'... that inspired artist Henry Wilson and the excellent designer C. H. B. Quennell far outshine the rest of the group and produce work of high artistic sensibility.' In that book Muthesius discussed certain features of Quennell's illustrations and designs: fireplaces,Muthesius, 1904, p. 186 garden furniture and garden gates.

Positions
 1912–15: Member of the Council of Royal Institute of British Architects
 1914–25: Member of the Town Planning Committee of Royal Institute of British Architects
 1928–30: Member of the Board of Architectural Education

Personal life
He was the husband of Marjorie Quennell whom he met in 1903 at the Junior Art Worker's Guild and father of Peter Quennell. With his wife, he wrote extensively on social history.

Quennell died in December 1935.

His brother, Walter, a builder and property developer, was father of Joan Quennell, a Conservative M.P.Dod's Parliamentary Companion, ed. C. R. Dod and R. P. Dod, Dod's Parliamentary Companion Ltd., 1967, pg 461

Architectural works
1899 The Chapel, Cambridge House
1899 Design for Liskeard Church
1904 Gallops Homestead, Sussex
1904 Campbell Mausoleum, St Mary's Cemetery, Harrow Road, Hammersmith, London
1905 Vale Cottage and Burnt Oak Cottage, Bickley 
1905 Four Beeches, 3 Denbridge Road, Bickley 
1905 Phyllis Court, Rosecroft Avenue, Hampstead 
1905-6 St John's Church, Hall and Vicarage, Edmonton 
1906 1 Denbridge Road, Bickley
1906 Barn Hawe, 2 Denbridge Road, Bickley
1906 8 Denbridge Road, Bickley
1906 The Grosvenor Gallery, 157 New Bond Street (interior)
1907 19 Woodlands Road, Bickley
1907 24 Heath Drive, Hampstead (Listed Grade II)
1907 12 Denbridge Road, Bickley 
1907 19 St George's Road, Bickley 
1907 Halstow, 22 St George's Road, Bickley 
1908 Southborough House, 2 New London Rd, Chelmsford for F W Crittall
1908 10 Edward Road, Bromley
1909 21 St George's Road, Bickley
1909 Linden Oaks, 24 St George's Road, Bickley
1909 Denbridge House, Bickley
1910 Englefield, 8 Woodlands Road, Bickley 
1910 St Mark's School, Masons Hill, Bromley, Kent 
1911 Hadlow, 6 Woodlands Road, Bickley 
1911 Lynch House, Allerford, Somerset, Now called Bossington Hall 
1912 Deerwood, 7 Woodlands Road, Bickley 
1912 Mowden School, The Droveway, Hove 
1912-4 Aultmore, Inverness-shire Architectural Review No.51, 1922, pages 154–5,
1913 Orchard House, 5 Woodlands Road, Bickley 
1918–20 Houses at Braintree (1–41 Clockhouse Way and 152–194 Cressing Road) for Crittall 
1920 Southcourt Housing Estate, Barton Hartshorn, Buckinghamshire
1923 Housing Scheme, Aylesbury 
 -?- 19–21 Holbrook Lane, Chislehurst, Kent" 
 -?- Crabtrees, Gravel Path, Berkhamsted
 -?- 'Crockies' (assisted by Thomas Tait – location unknown) 
1926–32 Houses at Silver End, Essex for Crittall 
1926 The Manors, Silver End
 -?- Houses on Eastbury Road and Carew Road, Northwood, London
1931 New House, Oak Lodge, 47,Newlands Avenue, Radlett, Hertfordshire

Bibliography
1906 Modern Suburban Houses, Batsford, London, 1906
1906 A Guide to Norwich Cathedral, (Bell's Cathedral Series), 1906.
1910 "Symposium on Town Planning"
1911 "The House and its Equipment", Country Life (various articles)
1919 "Standard Types of Standardised Methods?",
1919 "Berkhamsted War Memorial Town Improvement Scheme"
1921 "How to Revive Public Confidence in Building"

Works in collaboration
Marjorie & C. H. B. Quennell, A History of Everyday Things in England, London, B. T. Batsford Ltd, 1918–1934
Volume I 1066–1449
Volume II 1500–1799
Volume III 1733–1851
Volume IV 1852–1914
Marjorie & C. H. B. Quennell, A History of Everyday Life in.., London, B. T. Batsford Ltd, 1921–1926.
Everyday Life in Anglo-Saxon, Viking, and Norman times
Everyday Life in Roman Britain
Everyday Life in Prehistoric Times (vol. 1 The Old Stone Age, vol. 2 The New Stone Age)
Marjorie & C. H. B. Quennell, Everyday Things in Greece, London, B. T. Batsford Ltd, 1929–1932.
Vol 1, Homeric Greece
Vol 2, Archaic Greece
Vol 3, Classical Greece
Marjorie & C. H. B. Quennell, The Good New Days, London, B. T. Batsford Ltd., 1935.
C. H. B. & P. Quennell Somerset. (Shell Guide.) London: Architectural Press, 1938

References

External links
 C H B Quennell (entry) at Dictionary of Scottish Architects
 
 
 Marjorie and C.H.B. Quennell, A History of Everyday Things in England, 1066-1799'' (online copy) (1918) at Wayback Machine
 Peter Quennell (entry) at Oxford Dictionary of National Biography
 Laura Carter, ‘Shall we judge him by his WORK?’: The Quennells and the primitive craftsman at Histories of Archaeology Research Network (HARN), University of Cambridge

Architects from London
English illustrators
English furniture designers
20th-century English historians
1935 deaths
1872 births